The Jim Haberl Hut is an alpine hut located in the Tantalus Range near Squamish, British Columbia.  The hut is maintained by the Alpine Club of Canada - Vancouver Section.

The hut sleeps 12, and is equipped with mattresses, cooking utensils, propane cooktops, and a propane heater.  It was named for mountain guide, author and photojournalist Jim Haberl, who was killed in an avalanche while mountaineering in Alaska on April 29, 1999. The hut was built with the generous assistance of Alpine Club of Canada volunteers, the Jim Haberl Fund, and the Department of National Defense, 192 Airfield Engineering Flight in Abbotsford, BC.

The hut is located in the Serratus-Dione col, about a 6-hour hike above Lake Lovely Water and the Tantalus Hut or a full 14 hours (usually done over two days) from the Squamish River. The site is located on the edge of Tantalus Provincial Park.

Nearby
 Tantalus Range
 Mount Tantalus (2603m)
 Mount Dione (2590m)
 Alpha Mountain (2305m)
 Serratus Mountain (2326m)

External links
 Jim Haberl Hut at the Alpine Club of Canada
 Jim Haberl Hut at bivouac.com
 Air Reserve partnership announcement to build the hut
 Jim Haberl accident article at mountainzone.com

References

Mountain huts in Canada
Sea-to-Sky Corridor
Buildings and structures in British Columbia